Takahiro Kajita  (born July 24, 1976) is a Japanese mixed martial artist. He competed in the Lightweight division.

Mixed martial arts record

|-
| Loss
| align=center| 18-18-5
| Shota Shidochi
| Decision (Unanimous)
| Deep: Cage Impact 2012 in Tokyo: 2nd Round
| 
| align=center| 2
| align=center| 5:00
| Tokyo, Japan
| 
|-
| Win
| align=center| 18-17-5
| Seong-Jae Kim
| Decision (Unanimous)
| Deep: Nagoya Impact 2012: Kobudo Fight
| 
| align=center| 2
| align=center| 5:00
| Nagoya
| 
|-
| Loss
| align=center| 17-17-5
| Taro Kusano
| Decision (Unanimous)
| Deep: Osaka Impact
| 
| align=center| 2
| align=center| 5:00
| Osaka, Japan
| 
|-
| Loss
| align=center| 17-16-5
| Yusuke Kagiyama
| Decision (Unanimous)
| Deep: Nagoya Impact: Kobudo Fight
| 
| align=center| 2
| align=center| 5:00
| Kasugai
| 
|-
| Win
| align=center| 17-15-5
| Charles Bellemare
| TKO (Punches)
| Deep: Fujisan Festival
| 
| align=center| 2
| align=center| 3:20
| Fuji
| 
|-
| Win
| align=center| 16-15-5
| Juri Ohara
| Decision (Unanimous)
| Deep: 56 Impact
| 
| align=center| 2
| align=center| 5:00
| Tokyo, Japan
| 
|-
| Loss
| align=center| 15-15-5
| Koshi Matsumoto
| Decision (Unanimous)
| Shooto: Shooto the Shoot 2011
| 
| align=center| 2
| align=center| 5:00
| Tokyo, Japan
| 
|-
| Loss
| align=center| 15-14-5
| Kota Shimoishi
| Decision (Unanimous)
| Shooto: Gig Central 23
| 
| align=center| 2
| align=center| 5:00
| Nagoya, Aichi, Japan
| 
|-
| Loss
| align=center| 15-13-5
| Hiroki Aoki
| Submission (Rear-Naked Choke)
| Deep: Cage Impact 2011 in Nagoya
| 
| align=center| 2
| align=center| 2:15
| Nagoya
| 
|-
| Win
| align=center| 15-12-5
| Hiroshi Shiba
| Decision (Unanimous)
| Shooto: Gig West 13
| 
| align=center| 2
| align=center| 5:00
| Osaka, Kansai, Japan
| 
|-
| Win
| align=center| 14-12-5
| Taro Kusano
| Decision (Unanimous)
| Shooto: Gig Central 22
| 
| align=center| 2
| align=center| 5:00
| Nagoya, Aichi, Japan
| 
|-
| Draw
| align=center| 13-12-5
| Hisaki Hiraishi
| Draw (Unanimous)
| Pancrase: Passion Tour 12
| 
| align=center| 2
| align=center| 5:00
| Osaka, Osaka, Japan
| 
|-
| Win
| align=center| 13-12-4
| Tristan Connelly
| Decision (Unanimous)
| Deep: Cage Impact in Nagoya
| 
| align=center| 2
| align=center| 5:00
| Nagoya
| 
|-
| Win
| align=center| 12-12-4
| Michiyuki Ishibashi
| Decision (Split)
| Shooto: Gig Central 20
| 
| align=center| 2
| align=center| 5:00
| Nagoya, Aichi, Japan
| 
|-
| Loss
| align=center| 11-12-4
| Yasuaki Kishimoto
| Submission (Rear-Naked Choke)
| Deep: Kobudo Fight 9
| 
| align=center| 2
| align=center| 4:57
| Nagoya
| 
|-
| Win
| align=center| 11-11-4
| Jun Kito
| Submission (Armbar)
| BC: Battle Code 1
| 
| align=center| 2
| align=center| 2:58
| Nagoya, Aichi, Japan
| 
|-
| Loss
| align=center| 10-11-4
| Takafumi Ito
| Decision (Unanimous)
| Pancrase: Changing Tour 7
| 
| align=center| 2
| align=center| 5:00
| Osaka, Osaka, Japan
| 
|-
| Loss
| align=center| 10-10-4
| Hisaki Hiraishi
| Decision (Unanimous)
| Shooto: Gig Central 18
| 
| align=center| 2
| align=center| 5:00
| Nagoya, Aichi, Japan
| 
|-
| Win
| align=center| 10-9-4
| Yuya Osugi
| TKO (Punches)
| Deep: Toyama Impact
| 
| align=center| 1
| align=center| 3:36
| Toyama
| 
|-
| Loss
| align=center| 9-9-4
| Paolo Milano
| Decision (Split)
| Shooto: Gig Central 17
| 
| align=center| 2
| align=center| 5:00
| Nagoya, Aichi, Japan
| 
|-
| Draw
| align=center| 9-8-4
| Tomoyuki Fukami
| Draw
| Deep: clubDeep Kyoto
| 
| align=center| 2
| align=center| 5:00
| Kyoto
| 
|-
| Win
| align=center| 9-8-3
| Komei Okada
| Decision (Unanimous)
| Shooto: Gig Central 15
| 
| align=center| 2
| align=center| 5:00
| Nagoya, Aichi, Japan
| 
|-
| Loss
| align=center| 8-8-3
| Yoshihiro Tomioka
| Submission (Kimura)
| Deep: clubDeep Toyama: Barbarian Festival 7
| 
| align=center| 2
| align=center| 2:59
| Toyama
| 
|-
| Loss
| align=center| 8-7-3
| Yutaka Ueda
| Decision (Unanimous)
| Shooto: Gig Central 14
| 
| align=center| 2
| align=center| 5:00
| Nagoya, Aichi, Japan
| 
|-
| Win
| align=center| 8-6-3
| Hiroshi Shiba
| Decision (Majority)
| Deep: Protect Impact 2007
| 
| align=center| 2
| align=center| 5:00
| Osaka
| 
|-
| Loss
| align=center| 7-6-3
| Kosuke Umeda
| Decision (Majority)
| Deep: clubDeep Tokyo
| 
| align=center| 2
| align=center| 5:00
| Tokyo, Japan
| 
|-
| Loss
| align=center| 7-5-3
| Un Sik Song
| Submission (Triangle Choke)
| MARS 8: Burning Red
| 
| align=center| 1
| align=center| 2:56
| Tokyo, Japan
| 
|-
| Win
| align=center| 7-4-3
| Marcelo Shigeo Kobayashi
| TKO (Punches)
| Deep: clubDeep Nagoya: MB3z Impact, Power of a Dream
| 
| align=center| 1
| align=center| 2:40
| Nagoya
| 
|-
| Loss
| align=center| 6-4-3
| Yoshihiro Koyama
| Decision (Majority)
| Shooto: Gig Central 12
| 
| align=center| 2
| align=center| 5:00
| Nagoya, Aichi, Japan
| 
|-
| Win
| align=center| 6-3-3
| Saburo Kawakatsu
| TKO (Punches)
| Shooto: Gig Central 11
| 
| align=center| 1
| align=center| 4:43
| Nagoya, Aichi, Japan
| 
|-
| Win
| align=center| 5-3-3
| Yosuke Mikami
| KO (Punch)
| Shooto: Gig Central 10
| 
| align=center| 1
| align=center| 2:06
| Nagoya, Aichi, Japan
| 
|-
| Draw
| align=center| 4-3-3
| Tomoyuki Fukami
| Draw
| Real Rhythm: 4th Stage
| 
| align=center| 2
| align=center| 5:00
| Osaka, Japan
| 
|-
| Win
| align=center| 4-3-2
| Rodrigo Facca
| TKO (Punches)
| Deep: clubDeep Nagoya: MB3z Impact, Di Entrare
| 
| align=center| 1
| align=center| 3:19
| Nagoya
| 
|-
| Draw
| align=center| 3-3-2
| Joe Camacho
| Draw
| Real Rhythm: 3rd Stage
| 
| align=center| 2
| align=center| 5:00
| Osaka, Japan
| 
|-
| Draw
| align=center| 3-3-1
| Kazuhide Terashita
| Draw
| Deep: clubDeep Toyama: Barbarian Festival 3
| 
| align=center| 2
| align=center| 5:00
| Toyama
| 
|-
| Loss
| align=center| 3-3
| Ken Omatsu
| Decision (Majority)
| Shooto: Gig Central 8
| 
| align=center| 2
| align=center| 5:00
| Nagoya, Aichi, Japan
| 
|-
| Win
| align=center| 3-2
| Byon Sho Kim
| Submission (Toe Hold)
| G-Shooto: Special 01
| 
| align=center| 1
| align=center| 3:16
| Nagoya, Aichi, Japan
| 
|-
| Win
| align=center| 2-2
| Hiroshi Shiba
| Decision (Split)
| Shooto: Gig Central 7
| 
| align=center| 2
| align=center| 5:00
| Nagoya, Aichi, Japan
| 
|-
| Loss
| align=center| 1-2
| Wataru Miki
| Decision (Split)
| Shooto: 2/6 in Kitazawa Town Hall
| 
| align=center| 2
| align=center| 5:00
| Setagaya, Tokyo, Japan
| 
|-
| Loss
| align=center| 1-1
| Seiki Uchimura
| Decision (Unanimous)
| Shooto 2004: 7/4 in Kitazawa Town Hall
| 
| align=center| 2
| align=center| 5:00
| Setagaya, Tokyo, Japan
| 
|-
| Win
| align=center| 1-0
| Toshikazu Iseno
| KO (Head Kick)
| Shooto: Gig Central 5
| 
| align=center| 1
| align=center| 4:50
| Nagoya, Aichi, Japan
|

See also
List of male mixed martial artists

References

External links
 

1976 births
Japanese male mixed martial artists
Lightweight mixed martial artists
Living people